The FIS Nordic Junior and U23 World Ski Championships 2019 took place in Lahti, Finland from 19 January to 27 January 2019. This was the 42nd Junior World Championships and the 14th Under-23 World Championships in nordic skiing.

This was the first championship where women compete in nordic combined. Ayane Miyazaki of Japan became the first female junior world champion by winning the normal hill/5 kilometre event on 23 January 2019.

Schedule
All times are local (UTC+2).

Cross-country

Nordic combined

Ski jumping

Medal summary

Junior events

Cross-country skiing

Nordic combined

Ski jumping

Under-23 events

Cross-country skiing

Medal Tables

All events

Junior events

Under-23 events

References

External links
Official website

2019
2019 in cross-country skiing
2019 in ski jumping
Junior World Ski Championships
2019 in Finnish sport
2019 in youth sport
International sports competitions hosted by Finland
January 2019 sports events in Europe
Sports competitions in Lahti